is a male Japanese sprinter. He set his 400 metres personal best at the 2009 Osaka Grand Prix, finishing in 45.16 seconds.

Competition record

Statistics

Personal bests

References

External links



1987 births
Living people
People from Takatsuki, Osaka
Sportspeople from Osaka Prefecture
Japanese male sprinters
Olympic male sprinters
Olympic athletes of Japan
Athletes (track and field) at the 2008 Summer Olympics
Athletes (track and field) at the 2012 Summer Olympics
Athletes (track and field) at the 2016 Summer Olympics
Asian Games gold medalists for Japan
Asian Games silver medalists for Japan
Asian Games medalists in athletics (track and field)
Athletes (track and field) at the 2006 Asian Games
Athletes (track and field) at the 2010 Asian Games
Athletes (track and field) at the 2014 Asian Games
Medalists at the 2010 Asian Games
Medalists at the 2014 Asian Games
Universiade medalists in athletics (track and field)
Universiade gold medalists for Japan
Universiade bronze medalists for Japan
Medalists at the 2009 Summer Universiade
World Athletics Championships athletes for Japan
Japan Championships in Athletics winners
20th-century Japanese people
21st-century Japanese people